is a 1959 Japanese tokusatsu fantasy action film directed by Kajirō Yamamoto, with special effects by Eiji Tsuburaya. The film was based on Journey to the West written by Wu Cheng'en and was the second adaptation of the novel by Yamamoto and Tsuburaya, after 1940's Enoken's Sun Wukong. It has never been released in the United States or dubbed and subtitled in English.

Plot 
The tale unfolds in Changan, capital of China during the Tang Dynasty. People are suffering and dying from floods, epidemics, and famine, and the Emperor believes he can save his country if he can obtain the holy script, San Tsang, from distant India. He discovers, however, that no one is willing to make the long journey because the roads to India are infested with savages and devils. The Emperor has a dream in which a hermit appears and tells him there is a brave boy, only 13 years old, by the name of Genjo who would be able to accomplish the mission. The Emperor summons the boy, gives him the name of San Tsang, after the name of the holy script, and sends him on the dangerous journey to India. San Tsang is first attacked by a band of savages and barely escapes death. When he is resting from exhaustion on the summit of a mountain, he hears strange music and notices a ray of light shining on him. Then appears Pon, messager of the goddess of Mercy, who leads him to a cave where  Sun Wu Kong has been confined for 500 years. Monkey King becomes San Tsang's first disciple to protect him on his long journey. Later they are joined by Pa Chieh and Wu Ching. The four are attacked by devils and spiders disguised in various forms, but finally San Tsang and his faithful followers reach the top of a mountain where they see their destination, India. The morning sun is shining on the snow-covered Himalayas, and the sweet voice of Pon is heard from the valley below.

Cast 

 Norihei Miki as Sun Wukong
 Fukutaro Ichikawa as Tang Sanzang
 Nobuo Chiba as Zhu Bajie
 Zeko Nakamura as Sha Wujing
 Yū Fujiki as Swordsman Chikujin
 Shoichi Hirose as Native chief
 Hideyo Amamoto as Secretary-General
Kaoru Yachigusa as Tsui Lan
Reiko Dan as Pon
Yoshio Kosugi as Devil King

Release 
Monkey Sun was distributed theatrically in Japan by Toho on April 19, 1959 as a double feature with I Want to Be a Shellfish. Kinema Club released the film on mail-order VHS in 1999; a DVD release by Toho followed in 2021.

References

External links 

 
 

1959 films
1950s Japanese-language films
Japanese fantasy action films
Tokusatsu films
Toho tokusatsu films
Films directed by Kajiro Yamamoto
Toho films
1950s Japanese films